Pyrinuron (Pyriminil, Vacor) is a chemical compound formerly used as a rodenticide. Commercial distribution was voluntarily suspended in 1979 and it is not approved by the Environmental Protection Agency for use in the United States.  If it is ingested by humans in high doses, it may selectively destroy insulin-producing beta cells in the pancreas causing type 1 diabetes. The neurodegeneration associated with Vacor is caused by its conversion to Vacor-mononucleotide (VMN) by NAMPT and VMN's subsequent activation of the NADase SARM1.

References

Rodenticides
Ureas
3-Pyridyl compounds
Nitrobenzenes